He Jingzhi (born November 1924), also known by his pen names Aimo and Jingzhi, is a politician and poet of People's Republic of China. He was a standing committee member of the 8th Chinese People's Political Consultative Conference, a standing committee member of the 7th National People's Congress, and a member of the 12th and 13th CCP Central Committee. He served as Minister of Culture of the People'e Republic of China and deputy head of the Propaganda Department of the Chinese Communist Party.

Biography
He was born in Yi County, Shandong Province, Republic of China in 1924. He went to Yan'an in 1940, he graduated from Department of Literature of Luxun Art Academy of Yan'an in 1942, where he majored in Chinese Literature. He joined the Chinese Communist Party at the age of 17. He continued writing from the 1940s, such as Collection of Fangge, Selected of He Jingzhi Poetry, Return to Yan'an, Song of Leifeng and China's October. He wrote The White Haired Girl with Ding Yi in 1945.

Personal life
He married Ke Yan (1924-2011) in October 1953, who was also a poet.

Works
 Collection of Fangge
 Selected of He Jingzhi Poetry
 Return to Yan'an
 Song of Leifeng 
 China's October
 The White Haired Girl

References

1924 births
Writers from Zaozhuang
Poets from Shandong
Ministers of Culture of the People's Republic of China
Living people
People's Republic of China politicians from Shandong
Chinese Communist Party politicians from Shandong
Chinese dramatists and playwrights
Politicians from Zaozhuang